Sylwester Czopek (born 1958 in Bełżyce) is the rector of Rzeszów University. He is an archaeologist and museologist. In 2011 Czopek received the Knight's Cross of the Order of Polonia Restituta.

Bibliography
 Sylwester Czopek — OPI

References

1958 births
Rectors of universities in Poland
Living people

Knights of the Order of Polonia Restituta
Maria Curie-Skłodowska University alumni